This is a list of diplomatic missions of Latvia, excluding honorary consulates. Latvia has a modest network of embassies and consulates around the world. The Latvian Ministry of Foreign Affairs oversees the maintenance of these missions.

Latvia and the other Baltic states, together with the Nordic countries have signed a memorandum of understanding on the posting of diplomats at each other's missions abroad, under the auspices of Nordic-Baltic Eight.

Current missions

Africa

Americas

Asia

Europe

Oceania

Multilateral organizations 
 Brussels (Permanent Mission to the European Union and NATO)
 Geneva (Permanent Mission to the United Nations and other international organizations)
 New York City (Permanent Mission to the United Nations)
 Paris (Permanent Mission to UNESCO)
 Strasbourg (Permanent Mission to the Council of Europe)
 Vienna (Permanent Mission to the United Nations and other international organizations)

Gallery

Closed missions

 Lisbon (Embassy) — closed in 2016

 Kaliningrad (Consular Department) — closed in 2022
 Pskov (Consulate) — closed in 2022
 St. Petersburg (Consulate-General) — closed in 2022

 Ljubljana (Embassy) — closed in 2014

See also
 Foreign relations of Latvia
 List of diplomatic missions in Latvia
 Ministry of Foreign Affairs (Latvia)

Notes

References

 

 
Latvia
Diplomatic missions